Elaphandra pastazensis is a species of flowering plant in the family Asteraceae. It is found only in Ecuador. Its natural habitat is subtropical or tropical moist lowland forests. It is threatened by habitat loss.

References

pastazensis
Flora of Ecuador
Near threatened plants
Taxonomy articles created by Polbot